Johan Ickx (born 1962) is director of the historical archive of the Section for Relations with States of the Holy See's Secretariat of State. He has spent his career in several departments of the Roman Curia. He has published research on a wide variety of subjects related to the history of the Catholic Church from the Middle Ages to the 19th-20th centuries.

Johan Ickx studied religious sciences, theology and philosophy at the Catholic University of Leuven and earned his doctorate in church history at the Pontifical Gregorian University. He worked as academic assistant at the journal Archivum Historiae Pontificiae, as an official of the Congregation for the Doctrine of the Faith, and as archivist of the Tribunal of the
Apostolic Penitentiary.

On 26 June 2008, while working at the Penitentiary, he was appointed to a five-year term as a consultor to the Congregation for the Causes of Saints. His appointment was renewed on 19 December 2013.

He is the author of a study of the Holy See's assessment of Germany's tactics in occupied Belgium during the First World War, La Guerre et le Vatican (2018). He argued that Eugenio Pacelli, the future Pope Pius XII who was then secretary of the Department of Extraordinary Ecclesiastical Affairs played a key role in bringing the Vatican to discount German propaganda and recognize Germany was trying "to terrorize the population" of Belgium.

In April 2018, he received the Romulus Prize (14de Romulusprijs) from the Rome Society of Leuven.

Selected writings
Author
 Translated as 
 Translated as 

 

Editor

References

External links
 

1962 births
Living people
Pontifical Gregorian University alumni
Officials of the Roman Curia